USS SC-632 was a SC-497 class submarine chaser that served in the United States Navy during World War II.  She was laid down on 23 February 1942 by the Mathis Yacht Building Co. in Camden, New Jersey and launched on 25 June 1942.  She was commissioned on 2 September 1942.  She foundered on 16 September 1945 off the coast of Okinawa. Her hulk was destroyed on 9 March 1948.

References
Submarine Chaser Photo Archive: SC-632
USS SC-632 (SC-632)

SC-497-class submarine chasers
Ships built by the Mathis Yacht Building Company
1942 ships
Maritime incidents in September 1945
Shipwrecks in the Pacific Ocean